Nakia Cockatoo (born 23 October 1996) is an Australian rules footballer who played for the Geelong Cats and the Brisbane Lions in the Australian Football League (AFL).

Early life
Cockatoo was born in the Northern Territory into a family of Indigenous Australian descent (Jupangati and Marrithiyal) and was raised the small town of Humpty Doo. He began playing football at Auskick level with the Humpty Doo Bombers. He played his junior football with Southern Districts in the NTFL and the Northern Territory Thunder in the NEAFL.

He has strong family connections to Queensland with his surname deriving from his great-great-great grandfather who was known as 'Old Man Cockatoo' in the Cape York Peninsula as well as three of his Queensland-based uncles Che, David and Donald playing professional football in the AFL. Several female cousins of his are also involved in the Gold Coast Suns' developmental football academy.

AFL career
Cockatoo was drafted with pick 10 in the 2014 AFL Draft, by Geelong Football Club. He made his debut in the first round of the 2015 AFL season against Hawthorn. 

Statistics
Updated to the end of round 22, 2022 

|- style="background:#eaeaea;"
| 2015 ||  || 5
| 11 || 3 || 5 || 47 || 37 || 84 || 29 || 19 || 0.3 || 0.5 || 4.3 || 3.4 || 7.6 || 2.6 || 1.7
|-
| 2016 ||  || 5
| 10 || 11 || 5 || 74 || 42 || 116 || 28 || 39 || 1.1 || 0.5 || 7.4 || 4.2 || 11.6 || 2.8 || 3.9
|- style="background:#eaeaea;"
| 2017 ||  || 5
| 11 || 11 || 11 || 73 || 30 || 103 || 24 || 42 || 1.0 || 1.0 || 6.6 || 2.7 || 9.4 || 2.2 || 3.8
|-
| 2018 ||  || 5
| 2 || 0 || 2 || 14 || 11 || 25 || 6 || 4 || 0.0 || 1.0 || 7.0 || 5.5 || 12.5 || 3.0 || 2.0
|- style="background:#eaeaea;"
| 2019 ||  || 5
| 0 || – || – || – || – || – || – || – || – || – || – || – || – || – || –
|-
| 2020 ||  || 5
| 0 || – || – || – || – || – || – || – || – || – || – || – || – || – || –
|- style="background:#eaeaea;"
| 2021 ||  || 12
| 7 || 5 || 1 || 18 || 24 || 42 || 5 || 22 || 0.7 || 0.1 || 2.6 || 3.4 || 6.0 || 0.7 || 3.1
|-
| 2022 ||  || 12
| 8 || 2 || 2 || 49 || 27 || 76 || 22 || 22 || 0.3 || 0.3 || 6.1 || 3.4 || 9.5 || 2.8 || 2.8
|- class=sortbottom
! colspan=3 | Career
! 49 !! 32 !! 26 !! 275 !! 171 !! 446 !! 114 !! 148 !! 0.7 !! 0.5 !! 5.6 !! 3.5 !! 9.1 !! 2.3 !! 3.0
|}

References

External links

Living people
1996 births
Geelong Football Club players
Brisbane Lions players
Northern Territory Football Club players
Australian rules footballers from the Northern Territory
Southern Districts Football Club players
Indigenous Australian players of Australian rules football